Angela Wright-Scott (born November 10, 1961) is an American hurdler. She competed in the women's 400 metres hurdles at the 1984 Summer Olympics.

References

External links
 

1961 births
Living people
Athletes (track and field) at the 1984 Summer Olympics
American female hurdlers
Olympic track and field athletes of the United States
Place of birth missing (living people)
21st-century American women